= Charlotte de Huybert =

Dutch poet, feminist and writer (born 1622)

Charlotte de Huybert (1622 – after 1644) was a Dutch poet, feminist and writer.

She was the daughter of Anthonie Jansz de Huybert (1583 – c. 1644), a lawyer and man of letters, and alderman and Charlotte de Trouget. They had a son called Andries, who died young. At the beginning of 1622, the De Huybert family lived in Amsterdam where Charlotte was born. They left for Leiden in 1623 and had another daughter called Maria.

In 1644, she married Adriaen de Looper (c. 1590 – after 1644) in Leiden.

Before the age of twenty, she sent her own poem to Doctor Johan van Beverwijck based on his From the family of women poem. Her poem can be read as an early defense of women's rights.
